Baysamun or Beisamoun (Beisamûn) was a small Palestinian Arab village, located  in the marshy Hula Valley northeast of Safad. In 1945, it had a population of 20. It was depopulated during the 1948 War on May 25, 1948, by the Palmach's First Battalion in Operation Yiftach.

Beisamoun is an important archaeological site for the Neolithic period, with two plastered human skulls, cremation signs and house floors found there. It stood in close proximity to another major Natufian ("Final Old Stone Age") site, 'Ain Mallaha.

History

Prehistoric and Bronze Age site

Kathleen Kenyon notes that Beisamoun disappeared under modern drainage systems set up by Israel; in the fish ponds created, Neolithic remains were found that included houses and two plastered skulls. Rectangular houses with plastered floors show striking similarities to those at Byblos. These "Levantine pier house[s]" were also found in Yiftahel, Ayn Ghazal, and Jericho.

A main period of habitation was during the Pre-Pottery Neolithic B era, but also Pottery Neolithic and Bronze Age remains have been found.

British Mandate village
The population of Baysamun in the 1922 census of Palestine consisted of 41 Muslims, increasing to 50 Muslims in 11 houses by 1931.

In the 1945 statistics the population was 20 Muslims, with a total of 2,102 dunams of land, according to an official land and population survey. Of this, 107 dunams were plantations and irrigable land, 1,817 for cereals; while 133 dunams was non-cultivable area.

1948, aftermath
It was depopulated during the 1948 War on May 25, 1948, by the Palmach's First Battalion in Operation Yiftach in a Whispering campaign.

In 1992 the village site was described: "No traces of the houses remain. The site is occupied by warehouses for agricultural implements used by Kibbutz Manara, which had been established in 1943. The land around the site is cultivated and fish ponds have been constructed close to it."

References

Bibliography

External links
Welcome To Baysamun
Baysamun, Zochrot
Baysamun, Villages of Palestine
Survey of Western Palestine, Map 4: IAA, Wikimedia commons

Arab villages depopulated during the 1948 Arab–Israeli War
District of Safad
Archaeological sites in Israel
Neolithic sites of Asia
Pre-Pottery Neolithic B